Subash Chandra Bose is a 2005 Telugu-language historical action drama film, produced by C.Ashwini Dutt on Vyjayanthi Movies banner, directed by veteran director K. Raghavendra Rao in his 101st film.  Starring Venkatesh, Shriya Saran, Genelia D'Souza and music composed by Mani Sharma. The film was disaster at the box office.

Plot 
The story takes place during the pre-Independence era, just before the British left India. Ashok, who is working on a TV channel with his girlfriend Anita, covers the meeting of a politician Venkat Ratnam. By seeing Venkat Ratnam there, Ashok gets images from the bygone era. In a flashback, it is revealed that in the year 1946, a man named Amarchandra / Subash Chandra Bose alias Chandram fights against local British officer George. Subash Chandra Bose worships the real freedom fighter Subash Chandra Bose. When the state governor Jackson comes to Chintapalli along with his daughter Diana for a brief vacation, Bose welcomes him by blowing up the water tank in his palace. Enraged, Jackson asks his army to kill Bose. With the help of a local native Bandodu, the British army wipes out the entire village population, including Bose's lover Swarajyam. In an act of betrayal by Bandodu, the army kills Bose too. Ashok realizes that he is the reincarnation of  Bose and Venkat Ratnam is Bandodu. In the climax, Bose kills Venkat Ratnam.

Cast 

 Venkatesh as Amarchandra / Subash Chandra Bose alias Chandram / Ashok (dual role)
 Shriya Saran as Swarajyam
 Genelia D'Souza as Anita
 Prakash Raj as Venkat Ratnam / Bandodu
 Gulshan Grover as British Army Officer George
 Raza Murad as Ranjit Singh
 Tom Alter as Governor Jackson 
 Brahmanandam as Balram
 Sunil as Chandram's sidekick
 Ali as Kareem
 Tanikella Bharani as Bapiveedu
 L. B. Sriram as RTO Officer
 Sudha as Ashok's mother
 Subbaraju as Rajaratnam, Venkat Ratnam's son
 Naramalli Sivaprasad as Washerman
 Maalin Maria Mobargh as Diana
 Malladi Raghava as Anitha's father
 Vinaya Prasad
 Kota Srinivasa Rao 
 Babu Mohan
 Venu Madhav 
 Paruchuri Venkateswara Rao 
 Krishna Bhagavan 
 Subbaraya Sharma
 Chitti Babu 
 Gowtham Raju
 Hari Kishan 
 Manik
 Kalpana  
 Swathi 
 Apoorva
 Shobha Rani 
 Baby Kavya

Soundtrack 

Music was composed by Mani Sharma. Music was released on ADITYA Music Company.

Release

Critical reception 
The movie generally received mixed reviews from critics. Venkatesh performance as describe by reviewer, "Venkatesh is impressive as Ashok. The character of Subash Chandra Bose did not suit Venkatesh"; "Venkatesh did well in both roles of Chandram and Ashok. However, the characterizations of these two characters are not good enough to exploit the histrionics of Venkatesh. He has shown variation in the get-up of both the characters";"Venkatesh sleep-walks in his dual role as Ashok and Chandram". Among the heroines reviewers describe Shriya's performance as "Shriya, who plays Venkatesh’s lover in the past, looks glamorous, but is there just for the usual song ‘n’ dance routine"; "Shriya is sexy and her movements are very sensuous."; " Shriya is cute in the role of innocent patriotic village belle. Her costumes are very simple as they represent the culture of 1940s. She is sensuous and at the same time voluptuous in the song of 'Neredi Pandu'.". While Genelia receive mostly negative review from the critics. This is mainly due to Genelia's character was short and weak compare to Shriya and she also fails to perform well. Technically the film receive mostly negative review because the lack of perfection in the story and the poor handling in the direction.

Box-office 

The movie eventually becomes a flop  film at the box office.

Remake
This film was remade in Bengali as Abar Asbo Firey in 2006.

Awards 
Nandi Awards
 Best Editor - Kotagiri Venkateswara Rao
 Best Costume Designer - Basha
 Best Makeup - R. V. Raghava

References

External links 

2000s Telugu-language films
2005 films
Films directed by K. Raghavendra Rao
Films scored by Mani Sharma
2000s masala films
Films set in 1940
Films about reincarnation
Telugu films remade in other languages